Streptomyces fradiae is a species of Actinomycetota. Different strains of S. fradiae are known to produce the antibiotics neomycin, tylosin, and fosfomycin.

References

External links
Type strain of Streptomyces fradiae at BacDive -  the Bacterial Diversity Metadatabase

fradiae